The 2007 Vuelta a España, the 62nd edition of the cycle race, took place from 1 September until 23 September 2007. For the first time in a decade, the race started in the region of Galicia, at Vigo, home to Óscar Pereiro, with a flat stage. It was also an unusual Vuelta because the first summit finish came already on the fourth day of racing, with a stage ending atop the famed Lagos de Covadonga.
The race was won by Denis Menchov, who also won the Mountains competition and the combined classification, and finished second in the points competition.

Participating teams

  
 
 
 
 
 
 
 
 
 
 
 
 
 
 
 
 
 
 
 Andalucía–CajaSur
 Karpin–Galicia
 Relax–GAM

Route

Jersey progress

Jersey wearers when same rider is leading more than one classification
 Óscar Freire wore granate jersey on stage 2
 Daniele Bennati wore granate jersey on stage 3
 On stage 4, granate jersey should have been worn by Paolo Bettini, because he was 2nd in classification after Freire, who was also overall leader. However, world champion Bettini was allowed to ride in his usual rainbow jersey.
 Leonardo Piepoli wore white jersey on stages 5–8 and stage 11
   
 Vladimir Efimkin wore white jersey on stages 9–10, 12–13, 16-18
 Leonardo Piepoli led the KoM classification after stage 11 and should have worn the appropriate jersey on stage 12, but withdrew before its start; therefore, Serafín Martínez wore the mountains jersey on stages 12–14
 Cadel Evans wore white jersey on stages 14–15
 Jurgen Van Goolen wore the mountains jersey on stage 15 and on stages 19–21

Final standings

General classification

KOM Classification

Points Classification

Team classification

Withdrawals

References

External links
Race website

 
2--7
Espana
2007 in Spanish road cycling